The Moskva class, Soviet designation Project 1123 Kondor (condor) and S-703 Project 1123M Kiev, was the first class of operational aircraft carriers (helicopter cruisers in the Soviet classification) built by the Soviet Union for the Soviet Navy.

These ships were laid down at Nikolayev South (Shipyard No.444). The lead vessel was launched in 1965 and named ; she entered service two years later. Both were conventionally powered.

The Moskvas were not true "aircraft carriers" in that they did not carry any fixed-wing aircraft; the air wing was composed entirely of helicopters. They were designed primarily as anti-submarine warfare (ASW) vessels, and her weapons and sensor suite was optimized against the nuclear submarine threat. Their strategic role was to defend the Soviet ballistic missile submarine bastions against incursions by Western attack submarines, forming the flagships of an ASW task force.

Design

The operational requirement was issued by Admiral Sergey Gorshkov in 1959. The aim of the ships was to counter NATO Polaris submarines and act as a flagship for anti-submarine warfare. Initially it was hoped to operate ten helicopters from an 8000-ton ship. The design evolved into a larger vessel capable of operating up to 14 helicopters with self defence armament.

Armament

Shipboard ASW armament included a twin  SUW-N-1 launcher capable of delivering a FRAS-1 projectile carrying a  torpedo (or a 5 kiloton nuclear warhead); a pair of RBU-6000 ASW mortars; and a set of torpedo tubes. For self-defence, the Moskvas had two twin SA-N-3 surface-to-air missile (SAM) launchers with reloads for a total of 48 surface-to-air missiles, along with two twin  /80 guns.

Propulsion

Gas turbines were considered but were as yet untried in such a large vessel. Instead a high pressure steam plant similar to that used by the s was used. The machinery of Moskva had severe problems and had to be rebuilt in 1973 following a fire. Sea keeping was also disappointing.

Ships 

Both vessels were part of the Black Sea Fleet. Leningrad was retired in 1991 and Moskva in 1996. Leningrad was scrapped in 1995 and Moskva in 1997. A third ship to be named Kiev was cancelled in 1969, which was to have been an anti-surface warfare vessel. The Moskva class was succeeded by the larger .

See also
 List of ships of the Soviet Navy
 List of ships of Russia by project number

References

Citations

Sources
  Also published as

External links
 Moskva class - Complete Ship List
 Project 1123 Kondor - Moskva class on globalsecurity.org
  Moskva class

Helicopter carrier classes
 
Moskva class helicopter carrier